Time was first published in 1923. As Time became established as one of the United States' leading news magazines, an appearance on the cover of Time became an indicator of notability, fame or notoriety. Such features were accompanied by articles.

European, Middle Eastern, African, Asian and South Pacific versions of the magazine were published in addition to the United States edition. This article distinguishes versions when the covers are different.

For other decades, see Lists of covers of Time magazine.

2010

2011

2012

2013

2014

2015

2016

2017

2018

2019

References

External links
 Time The Vault

2010s
Covers of Time magazine
Covers of Time magazine
Time magazine (2010s)